Carmen Jones is a 1943 Broadway musical with music by Georges Bizet (orchestrated for Broadway by Robert Russell Bennett) and lyrics and book by Oscar Hammerstein II which was performed at The Broadway Theatre. Conceptually, it is Bizet's opera Carmen updated to a World War II-era African-American setting. Bizet's opera was, in turn, based on the 1846 novella by Prosper Mérimée. The Broadway musical was produced by Billy Rose, using an all-black cast, and directed by Hassard Short. Robert Shaw prepared the choral portions of the show.

The original Broadway production starred Muriel Smith (alternating with Muriel Rahn) in the title role. The original Broadway cast members were nearly all new to the stage; Kennedy and Muir write that on the first day of rehearsal only one member had ever been on a stage before.

The 1954 film was adapted by Hammerstein and Harry Kleiner. It was directed by Otto Preminger and starred Dorothy Dandridge and Harry Belafonte.

The musical has also been revived in London, running for a season in 1991 at London's Old Vic and most recently in London's Royal Festival Hall in the Southbank Centre in 2007.

In 2018, it was revived off-Broadway at the Classic Stage Company under the direction of John Doyle and Anika Noni Rose in the title role.

Plot
Parachute maker Carmen Jones makes a play for a "fly boy" Air Force man, Joe, who is in love with sweet Cindy Lou and about to marry her on a day pass when Carmen gets into a fight with another woman.

Joe's pass is cancelled in order for him to drive her to the next town to be handed over to the non-military police.  Instead, Carmen charms him and escapes, and he is put in the stockade for not delivering her to the authorities.

While Carmen waits for Joe to be released from military prison, she hangs around Billy Pastor's jive cafe where she encounters boxer Husky Miller, who is instantly besotted with Carmen, calling her "heatwave".

Carmen is initially uninterested. But her friends Frankie and Mert know that their invitation from Husky's manager to see him fight in Chicago depends on Carmen's being there, too.

Joe, having been released from the stockade, turns up at the cafe the same evening. At first, his prospects seem to be looking up, as his connections have put Joe back on track for aviator school. He immediately gets into a fight with his sergeant, who is making a move on Carmen, as well as laying down some heavy shade on Joe. Starting the fight alone would have been enough to put Joe back in military prison for years, but the fight goes badly, and the sergeant ends up apparently dead. Carmen makes Joe hide the body, since desertion sounds better than a lengthy sentence.

The train ticket to Chicago originally given to Carmen offers them a way of avoiding the MPs. After a few days hiding out in a seedy hotel with no money and no future with Joe, Carmen pays a visit to her two friends, now covered in diamonds and furs, at Husky's training camp. She is only looking for a loan, but they try to draw her to give up Joe and "go with the money" by staying with Husky.

Later, at Husky's apartment, Frankie reads Carmen's "cards", and reveals the Nine of Spades - the card of Death. In the belief that her days are numbered, Carmen gives in to Husky's advances, abandoning Joe for the luxurious life Husky can offer her.

Cindy Lou comes to look for Joe, but he is still in love with Carmen and spurns Cindy Lou.  The night of Husky's title fight, Joe turns up to try to convince Carmen to come back to him, but when she rejects him, he kills her, thus making the card's prophecy a reality.

Music
Oscar Hammerstein II heavily adapted the libretto for Georges Bizet's opera Carmen from the original French for his Broadway production. Arts and Entertainment Editor Elisabeth Vincentelli further clarifies: "The music was pretty much left intact, but Hammerstein transferred the action to WWII America. Carmen's tobacco factory became Carmen Jones' parachute factory, bullfighter Escamillo became boxer Husky Miller, and so on. As if this weren't enough, there also was the 'small' detail of casting the show only with African-Americans...many of the show's songs retain a surprising impact. The feverish intensity of 'Beat Out dat Rhythm on a Drum', for instance, hasn't dimmed over the years, and the song's been covered by a wide variety of performers, from Pearl Bailey and Marc Almond to Mandy Patinkin."  The majority of the actors performing the songs in the film Carmen Jones were dubbed.  Even singer Harry Belafonte was dubbed (by LeVern Hutcherson), and Dorothy Dandridge was dubbed by Marilyn Horne (long before Horne became a well-known opera singer).

Songs

 Act 1
 Overture
 Lift 'Em Up and Put 'Em Down (Avec la garde montante in Bizet's original opera) – Street Boys
 Honey Gal o' Mine – Male Chorus
 Good Luck, Mr. Flyin' Man! – Female Chorus
 Dat's Love (Habanera in Bizet's opera) – Carmen and Chorus 
 You Talk Just like My Maw (Parle-moi de ma mère in Bizet's opera)– Joe and Cindy Lou
 Murder-Murder – Female Chorus
 Carmen Jones Is Goin' to Jail! – Pit Chorus
 Dere's a Cafe on de Corner (Seguidilla in Bizet's opera) – Carmen and Joe
 Beat Out Dat Rhythm on a Drum (Gypsy Song in Bizet's opera) – Frankie, Chorus
 Stan' Up and Fight (Toreador Song, also known as March of the Toreadors in Bizet's opera) – Husky Miller and Chorus
 Whizzin' Away Along de Track (Quintet (Nous avons en tête une affaire) in Bizet's opera) – Rum, Dink, Myrt, Frankie, and Carmen
 Dis Flower (Flower Song in Bizet's opera) – Joe
 If You Would Only Come Away – Carmen and Joe

 Act 2
 De Cards Don't Lie (Card Song in Bizet's opera) – Frankie, Myrt, Carmen, and female chorus
 Dat Ol' Boy – Carmen
 Poncho de Panther from Brazil – Frankie, Myrt, Husky Miller, Rum, and Chorus
 My Joe (Micaela's Air in Bizet's opera) – Cindy Lou
 Finale (of Act II Scene I) – Carmen, Joe, Cindy Lou, Husky Miller, Rum, Dink, Frankie, and Myrt
 Git Yer Program for de Big Fight – Chorus
 Dat's Our Man! (Les voici in Bizet's opera) – Chorus
 Finale – Carmen, Joe, Chorus

Awards and nominations

Original London production

See also

African American musical theater
Orson Welles' Macbeth, conceptual black casting theatre production, 1936.

References

Bibliography

External links
Carmen Jones at Ovrtur
Carmen Jones at Playbill
Carmen Jones at Festival Bruxellons!
Carmen Jones at RodgersAndHammerstein.com

1943 musicals
All-Black cast Broadway shows
Broadway musicals
West End musicals
Musicals based on operas
Musicals based on multiple works
Laurence Olivier Award-winning musicals
Musicals based on short fiction
Georges Bizet
Works based on Carmen (novella)